Kadra Dam is situated in Uttara Kannada district of Karnataka state in India.

The dam is constructed across river Kalinadi. The dam was primarily built as hydroelectric project for supply of water to turbines of electric  power generating station. The project started generating power since 1997. The Dam was built and is operated by KPCL since the year 1997.

References

External links
Kadra

Dams in Karnataka
Buildings and structures in Uttara Kannada district
Tourist attractions in Uttara Kannada district
Dams completed in 1997
1997 establishments in Karnataka
20th-century architecture in India